Events from 1932 in Catalonia.

Incumbents

 President of the Generalitat of Catalonia – Francesc Macià

Events
 18–23 January – Anarchist revolt in Alt Llobregat mining basin.
 3 February – Institut-Escola de la Generalitat opened.
 9 September – The Cortes of the Republic approve the Statute of Autonomy of Catalonia.
 20 November – First election to the Parliament of Catalonia. The Republican Left of Catalonia win the large majority of seats.

References